Maurice Edmond Karl de Rothschild (19 May 1881 – 4 September 1957) was a French art collector, vineyard owner, financier and politician. He was born into the Rothschild banking family of France.

Early life
Maurice de Rothschild was born on 19 May 1881 in Boulogne-Billancourt near Paris. He was the second child of Edmond James de Rothschild (1845–1934) and Adelheid von Rothschild. He grew up at the Château Rothschild in Boulogne-Billancourt.

Career
Rothschild inherited a fortune from the childless Adolphe Carl von Rothschild (1823–1900) of the Naples branch of the family and moved to Geneva, Switzerland where he perpetuated the new Swiss branch of the family.

Rothschild was elected in 1919 to the Chamber of Deputies, where he served until 1929. Between 1929 and 1945, he was a member of the Senate for Hautes-Alpes.

In June 1940, during the Battle of France, Rothschild and several family members received Portuguese visas from Aristides de Sousa Mendes, allowing them to flee France for Portugal. Maurice de Rothschild sailed from Lisbon to Scotland the following month.

Personal life and death
In 1909 Maurice de Rothschild married Noémie de Rothschild. Her mother was Marie Hermine Rodrigues Péreire (1860–1936), daughter of Eugène Péreire of the Péreire banking family whose Crédit Mobilier were arch-competitors of the Rothschilds. Noémie Halphen and Maurice de Rothschild had one child, a son Edmond.

Legacy
Maurice de Rothschild is commemorated in the scientific name of a species of Malagasy lizard, Paracontias rothschildi.

Maurice de Rothschild's African expedition 1904-1905, zoological in nature, was conveyed in a three-volume 
archive and published in 1922, entitled "Voyage de M. le baron Maurice de Rothschild en Éthiopie et en Afrique orientale anglaise (1904-1905) : résultats scientifiques : animaux articulés ". It is housed at the Biological Diversity Heritage Library.

References

Further reading
 The Rothschilds; a Family Portrait by Frederic Morton. Atheneum Publishers (1962)  (1998 reprint)
 The Rothschilds, a Family of Fortune by Virginia Cowles. Alfred A. Knopf (1973)  
 Rothschild: The Wealth and Power of a Dynasty by Derek Wilson. Scribner, London (1988) 
 House of Rothschild : Money's Prophets: 1798-1848 by Niall Ferguson. Viking Press (1998) 
 The House of Rothschild (vol. 2) : The World's Banker: 1849-1999 by Niall Ferguson. Viking Press (1999)

External links

 
 The Rothschild Archive - an international center in London for research into the history of the Rothschild family.

1881 births
1957 deaths
People from Boulogne-Billancourt
French financiers
French bankers
French philanthropists
French art collectors
Senators of Hautes-Alpes
French Senators of the Third Republic
20th-century French Jews
Maurice
Members of the 12th Chamber of Deputies of the French Third Republic
Members of the 13th Chamber of Deputies of the French Third Republic
Members of the 14th Chamber of Deputies of the French Third Republic